Maidreamin (stylized as maidreamin) is one of the largest maid café restaurant chains in Japan, owned by Neodelight International, Inc. The restaurant chain employs over 500 maids at 18 restaurants in Japan and Thailand.

History
Maidreamin's first location, the Akihabara Headquarter Store was opened on April 25, 2008. They opened their first restaurant outside Japan in Bangkok in 2013. Their latest store launched in Fukuoka in 2016.

In 2017, Maidreamin received the TripAdvisor Certificate of Excellence for 5 of its stores.

Collaborations
Maidreamin collaborated on promotions for video games Dx2 Shin Megami Tensei: Liberation, Goddess Masters, Kurokishi to Shiro no Maou, Shibuya design firm Team Labo, and cookware designer Joshi Spa.

Musical unit
Maidreamin's musical performance unit is known as "Quality Service Cleanliness Smile (QSCS)". The group performs regularly at Maidreamin's stores in Japan. They have appeared internationally at several Japanese anime and pop culture events, including Anime Expo, Ani:Me Abu Dhabi, Middle East Film and Comic Con Dubai, and Otakuthon Canada.

In July 2017, maidreamin released their first music CD, Maid in Tokyo. A second CD single, Shining days -Mata Au Himade-, was released in 2019.

References

External links

Japanese culture
Japanese popular culture
Types of coffeehouses and cafés
Restaurants in Tokyo
Cosplay
Coffeehouses and cafés in Japan